Waikato AFL is an Australian rules football competition in Waikato, New Zealand and is one of the Leagues governed by AFL New Zealand.

Current Clubs
Tui's
Mavericks (Dynasty team)
Redbacks (Mormon Community)

History
The Waikato AFL begun in humble fashion in 2004 when an ex-pat Western Australian started some training sessions in Hamilton. Jim Lucy had been a coach and Administrator with Takapuna AFL in Auckland, but wanted to grow the game in the Waikato where he was based. So in 2004 he created an article in the Waikato Times newspaper. A number of sportsman were interested in the sport and came along to see what it was all about. That first year saw 15-20 men meet at Eliott Park to learn the skills and game of Australian Rules Football. 
In 2005 the numbers grew until around 30 men met each Sunday. With numbers too small to form a competition, players learnt the skills and played "scratch" matches amongst themselves using a rugby field. Ambitiously they joined the AFLNZ in a weekend tournament to compete against the 3 established provinces; Auckland, Wellington and Canterbury. The NPC has been held around the Labour Weekend period but in a current restructuring will be moving to early December in 2013.
The Waikato representative side team took on the name, Waikato Thunder AFL (WTAFL) to distinguish themselves from Wellington AFL (WAFL) who had formed years prior.

Since entering their inaugural National Provincial Competition the Waikato Thunder have continued to grow. They now have 2 full-time teams Hamilton Mavericks, Hamilton Tuis) that compete each week and are on their way to forming a permanent 3rd Hamilton based team (Redbacks). The WTAFL season runs from mid August through to late October/early November. Games are currently held at Derek Heather Park in Western Heights, Hamilton on Saturdays at 1pm. Finding a permanent location for the sport is difficult due to the size of the field required - and oval 150m long by 110m wide. A permanent base is being sought within the Hamilton area.

Representative Side
The representative side for the Waikato AFL is known as the Waikato Thunder.

References

Australian rules football competitions in New Zealand
Sport in Waikato